Hokejaški klub Partizan (Serbian Cyrillic: Хокејашки клуб Партизан) is a Serbian professional ice hockey club from Belgrade. HK Partizan is one of the sport clubs that are part of Partizan sport society. They play their home games at the Pionir Ice Hall. The club currently plays in the Serbian Hockey League. HK Partizan has won 20 national championships and three cups, and is the most successful ice hockey team in Serbia. HK Partizan also won the Slohokej League in 2011 and 2012 and Balkan League in 1995.

History

The hockey section in the Partizan sport society was established in 1948, and at their first appearance at the state championship they won its first league title. In the period between 1951 and 1955, Partizan has been by far the strongest hockey team in the country winning 5 consecutive championship titles. Their roster was practically equal to the national team side, consisting of the best hockey players from many different nationalities, from Serbia (Dr. Zlatko Kovačević, Milan Jovanović, Nikola Stanimirović, Gantar Ladocki), Croatia (Josip Brelić, Alfred David, Boris Renaud and Mico Dušanović), from Macedonia (Blažo Piperski), Slovenia (Luce Žitnik), Montenegro (Blažo Mijušković), and in one season Canadian O 'Neil (officer of the embassy in Belgrade) helped them with his fantastic games and goals. Later, due to the departure of many crucial players, Partizan lost the primacy to Slovenian clubs in the championship. After a long break, Partizan won the Cup in 1966 and latter in 1986 they won both championship and cup, thus qualifying for European Cup. In the first round they eliminated Romanian champions Steaua, but lost in the second round to Polish champions Polonia Bytom. Partizan's second appearance in European cup came in 1996. They finished last in the first group round, behind Sokil Kyiv, Steaua Bucharest and Levski Sofia.

Honours

Players

Current roster

Notable former players
  John Murray
  Martin Surek
  Alex Andjelic
  Zvonko Mihajlovski
  Jocelyn Guimond

References

External links

 HK Partizan at eliteprospects.com

Fans and supporters:
 juznifront.com
 grobari1970.org

Sport in Belgrade
Ice hockey teams in Serbia
Ice hockey clubs established in 1948
1948 establishments in Serbia
Serbian Hockey League teams
Slohokej League teams
Articles containing video clips
Panonian League teams
Yugoslav Ice Hockey League teams